Iván Dereck Rodríguez (born June 5, 1992), nicknamed D-Rod, is an American professional baseball pitcher in the Minnesota Twins organization. The Twins selected Rodríguez in the sixth round of the 2011 MLB draft as an outfielder. He was converted to a pitcher in 2014. He made his MLB debut with the San Francisco Giants in 2018. He is the son of Hall of Famer Iván Rodríguez, and is affectionately known to fans as Son of Pudge.

Early and personal life 
Rodríguez was born in Arlington, Texas, to Maribel Rivera and Baseball Hall of Famer Iván Rodríguez. His father spent 21 years in Major League Baseball (MLB), won 13 Gold Gloves, and was a 14-time All-Star. He has three siblings. He grew up in Texas, and at age 10 moved to Florida, where he later on attended Monsignor Edward Pace High School in Opa-locka, Florida, and transitioned from catcher and played center field and pitched for the baseball team. 

Rodríguez likes to cook and mostly cooks the Puerto Rican food he grew up with. He also likes video games, including Fortnite. Rodríguez is married to Ashley Negrón, whom he met in 2015 at a basketball game in Puerto Rico. He is an avid Batman fan and has a Batman tattoo on his forearm.

Career

Minnesota Twins 
The Minnesota Twins selected Rodríguez in the sixth round of the 2011 MLB draft as an outfielder, and he signed for a $130,000 signing bonus. After he batted .216 with six home runs in 352 at bats at the Rookie-level in Minor League Baseball over his first three professional seasons, the Twins converted him into a pitcher in 2014. He was 2–2 with a 1.05 ERA in 17 relief appearances for the Elizabethton Twins. In 2015, Rodríguez had a 6–3 win–loss record and a 2.85 ERA with 61 strikeouts in 12 games started for Elizabethton, and was named the league's Pitcher of the Year. He also played in three games for the Cedar Rapids Kernels and Fort Myers Miracle. The next season, he pitched for Cedar Rapids, where he had a 4–11 win–loss record and a 5.08 ERA, and for Fort Myers where he pitched to a 1–2 record with a 2.56 ERA. During the 2016–17 offseason, he pitched for the Indios de Mayagüez of the Puerto Rican Professional Baseball League, and then pitched for the Criollos de Caguas in the 2017 Caribbean Series. He was named to the Puerto Rican national baseball team's roster for the 2017 World Baseball Classic. In 2017, he pitched for both Fort Myers and the Chattanooga Lookouts where he compiled a combined 10–6 record and 3.27 ERA in 26 games (24 starts) between both teams.

San Francisco Giants
Rodríguez signed a minor league contract with the San Francisco Giants organization for the 2018 season. He began the season with the Sacramento River Cats of the Class AAA Pacific Coast League. Rodriguez had a 4–1 win–loss record and a 3.40 ERA before the Giants promoted him to the major leagues on May 28.

Rodríguez made his major league debut in relief of Jeff Samardzija on May 29, 2018 against the Colorado Rockies. During the game, he pitched  innings and  hit an RBI double. Rodríguez has a successful rookie year with the Giants with a 6–4 record and 2.81 earned run average in 31 games. As a starter, he allowed 3 runs or less in 16 of his 19 starts and pitched 5 or more innings in 17 of his 19 starts.

Rodríguez struggled during the early portion of the 2019 season and was sent down to the Triple-A Sacramento River Cats. He was recalled and sent back down to Sacramento several times during the season and pitched in relief and made spot starts for the Giants. For the season, with Sacramento and San Jose he was 3–0 with a 3.67 ERA in seven starts in which he pitched 34.1 innings and struck out 37 batters. With the Giants, he was 6–11 with a 5.64 ERA and pitched in 28 games (16 starts) in which he pitched 99 innings.

In the 2020 season, Rodríguez only pitched in two games before being designated for assignment on August 26, 2020, to make space for Joey Rickard on the roster.

Detroit Tigers
On August 31, 2020, the Detroit Tigers claimed Rodríguez off waivers from the San Francisco Giants. On October 27, 2020, Rodríguez was outrighted off of the 40-man roster, without having made an appearance for Detroit. He became a free agent on November 2, 2020.

Colorado Rockies 
On November 9, 2020, Rodriguez signed a minor league contract with the Colorado Rockies organization that included an invitation to spring training.
Rodriguez spent the 2021 season with the Triple-A Albuquerque Isotopes, making 22 appearances, going 4–6 with a 6.72 ERA and 87 strikeouts. He became a free agent following the season.

Minnesota Twins (second stint)
On January 12, 2022, Rodriguez signed a minor league contract with the Minnesota Twins. The Twins promoted him to the major leagues on April 13. In his only appearance, Rodríguez allowed three runs on four hits and three walks while striking out two against the Los Angeles Dodgers. He was designated for assignment on April 15 after Kyle Garlick was added to the roster. He was sent outright to the Triple-A St. Paul Saints the next day. He elected free agency on October 6, 2022.

On January 20, 2023, Rodríguez re-signed with the Twins organization on a minor league contract.

See also
 List of second-generation Major League Baseball players

References

External links

1992 births
American sportspeople of Puerto Rican descent
Baseball players from Arlington, Texas
Cedar Rapids Kernels players
Chattanooga Lookouts players
Criollos de Caguas players
Elizabethton Twins players
Fort Myers Miracle players
Gulf Coast Twins players
Indios de Mayagüez players
Liga de Béisbol Profesional Roberto Clemente pitchers
Living people
Monsignor Edward Pace High School alumni
Major League Baseball pitchers
Minnesota Twins players
Sacramento River Cats players
San Francisco Giants players
2017 World Baseball Classic players
2023 World Baseball Classic players